José Mentor Guilherme de Mello Netto (30 September 1948 – 25 July 2020), better known simply as José Mentor, was a Brazilian lawyer and politician from the state of São Paulo who served as a Federal Deputy.

Career
Before pursuing a career in politics, Mentor graduated as a Lawyer at the Pontifical Catholic University of São Paulo.

Between the years of 1989 and 1991, he was elected and worked as a Member of the Legislative Assembly of São Paulo.

In 1992, he was elected City councilor of São Paulo. His tenure went from 1993 to 1996. In 1996, he was re-elected to the City council, and remained in office from 1997 to 2000, when he was again re-elected. His third and last term lasted until 2003.

in 2002, Mentor was elected a Member of the Chamber of Deputies, representing his birth state of São Paulo. His tenure went from 2003 to 2007, and in 2006, he was re-elected. His second term lasted from 2007 to 2011. In 2010, he was re-elected for a third term, lasting between 2011 and 2015. His fourth term started in 2015 and finished in 2019.

In 2018, he attempted to obtain a fifth term in the Chamber of Deputies, but he failed to secure enough votes to be elected.

Death
On 25 July 2020, Mentor died in São Paulo at the age of 71 due to complications brought on by COVID-19 during the COVID-19 pandemic in Brazil.

References

1948 births
2020 deaths
20th-century Brazilian politicians
20th-century Brazilian lawyers
Workers' Party (Brazil) politicians
Pontifical Catholic University of São Paulo alumni
Members of the Legislative Assembly of São Paulo
Members of the Chamber of Deputies (Brazil) from São Paulo
21st-century Brazilian politicians
Deaths from the COVID-19 pandemic in São Paulo (state)
People from Santa Isabel, São Paulo